The 2018 season was Scarborough SC's fourth season in the Canadian Soccer League. Their season official commenced on May 19, 2018 in an away match against FC Ukraine United. The season proved to be a successful one as Scarborough managed to compete in the top four and ultimately secured a playoff berth by finishing fourth in the First Division. In the postseason tournament Scarborough successfully defeated Hamilton City SC, and FC Ukraine in the earlier rounds in order to reach the CSL Championship final for the second straight season. Their opposition in the finals were FC Vorkuta, but ultimately were defeated in a penalty shootout.

While in the Second Division their reserve team made their debut, and successfully clinched a postseason berth. Their postseason participation came to an early conclusion after a defeat to Halton United. For the second consecutive season Aleksandar Stojiljković finished as the club's top goalscorer with 10 goals.

Summary 
In the off season Scarborough negotiated  a player agreement with York Region Shooters in order to acquire additional talent as the Shooters ceased operations for the 2018 season. Scarborough also launched their first reserve team in the Second Division under the management of Eddy Coronel. Further notable changes included the return of European journeyman Zoran Rajović in order to operate as a player-coach. As former head coach Krum Bibishkov departed after receiving a franchise in the Canadian Soccer League for his soccer academy SC Real Mississauga. Throughout the season Rajovic managed to secure Scarborough their third consecutive playoff berth by finishing fourth in the standings.

In the preliminary round of the postseason Scarborough defeated Hamilton City SC by a score of 4-1. In the following round Toronto faced division champions FC Ukraine United, and defeated them to reach the finals of the CSL Championship for the second consecutive year. In finals Scarborough faced FC Vorkuta, but were defeated in a penalty shootout. Meanwhile in the Second Division their reserve squad secured a postseason berth by finishing third. In the playoffs the team faced an early elimination from Halton United.

Players

First Division roster

Second Division roster

Management

Transfers

In

Out

Competitions

Canadian Soccer League

First Division

Results summary

Results by round

Matches

Postseason

Second Division

Results by round

Matches

Postseason

Statistics

Goals and assists 
Correct as of October 13, 2018

References 

Scarborough SC
Scarborough SC
Scarborough SC